Curll is a surname. Notable people with the surname include:

Edmund Curll (1675–1747), English bookseller and publisher
Walter Curll or Walter Curle (1575–1647), English bishop
Curll baronets